Elachista quadrata is a moth in the family Elachistidae. It was described by Edward Meyrick in 1932. It is found in India.

The wingspan is about 7.8 mm. The forewings are dark brown, the proximal part of the wing lighter and mottled by sparse brown scales on a greyish ground colour. The wing is distinctly darker beyond the middle and there is a narrow, transverse, white antemedial fascia and the costal and tornal spots are also white. The hindwings are dark brown.

References

Moths described in 1932
quadrata
Moths of Asia